The Roman Catholic Diocese of London is a Latin rite suffragan of the Metropolitan Archdiocese of Toronto in Ontario, southeastern Canada.

The present episcopal see of the Diocese, St. Peter's Cathedral, was built in a French Gothic Revival style from 1880 to 1885. It was raised to the status of a minor basilica by Pope John XXIII in December, 1961.

Statistics and Extent 
The Diocese covers the counties of Middlesex, Elgin, Norfolk, Oxford, Perth, Huron, Lambton, Kent and Essex.

As of 2020, it pastorally served 444,310 Catholics (22.8% of 1,944,182 total) on 21,349 km² in 130 parishes and 1 mission with 136 priests (101 diocesan, 35 religious), 73 deacons, 474 lay religious (1 brother, 473 sisters) and 11 seminarians.

The Diocese also runs St. Peter's Seminary, which is now affiliated with the University of Western Ontario.

In 2019, the Survivor's Network of those Abused by Priests (SNAP) confirmed that 36 priests were credibly accused of sexually abusing minors. Following media coverage of the list, the Diocese waived confidentiality of their previous settlements. When interviewed about the list compiled by SNAP, Bishop Ronald Fabbro of the Diocese of London indicated that four other priests whose names were not on the list were accused of sexual abuse of minors. Bishop Fabbro refused to disclose the names of the priests. His decision faced considerable backlash from survivors and advocates.

History 
 The Diocese of London was created on February 21, 1856 by Pope Pius IX, on territory carved out of the then Roman Catholic Diocese of Toronto (now a Metropolitan Archdiocese), along with the Diocese of Hamilton, Ontario. Pierre-Adolphe Pinsonnault was named the first Bishop of London on May 18 of that year.
 On 1859.02.02 it was renamed as Diocese of Sandwich / Sandvicen(sis) (Latin), as its first Bishop Pinsoneault moved the seat of the diocese to Sandwich, on the Detroit River
 On 1869.11.15 it was renamed back as Diocese of London / Londonen(sis) (Latin), the diocesan see having been returned under second Bishop John Walsh.
 On 2020.05.21 an Ontario appeals court dismissed a bid by the Diocese of London to drop a lawsuit filed by Irene Deschenes, who claimed that notorious predator priest Charles Henry Sylvestre sexually abused her when she was a minor between 1970 and 1973. Deschenes first began legal action against the Diocese of London in 1996. Sylvestre pled guilty in August 2006 to sexually abusing 47 females, whose ages ranged between 9 and 14, between 1952 and 1989 Local newspapers documented the lives of many of the women who refused the publication ban and spoke out about their abuse. He was given a three-year sentence in October 2006 and died January 22, 2007, of natural causes after only three months in prison. The case was documented by the Canadian Broadcasting Corporation news programme The Fifth Estate.

Bishops

Episcopal Ordinaries 
(all Roman Rite)

Suffragan Bishops of London, Ontario
 Pierre-Adolphe Pinsonnault (May 13, 1856 - 1859.02.02 see below)

Suffragan Bishops of Sandwich 
 Pierre-Adolphe Pinsonnault (see above 1859.02.02 - retired December 18, 1866), emeritus as Titular Bishop of Birtha (1868.12.04 – death 1883.01.30)
 John Walsh (November 10, 1867 - 1869.10.03 see below)

Suffragan Bishops of London, Ontario
 John Walsh (see above 1869.10.03 - July 25, 1889), next Metropolitan Archbishop of Toronto (Ontario, Canada) (1889.07.25 – death 1898.07.30)
 Denis (T.) O'Connor, Congregation of St. Basil (C.S.B.) (19 October 1890 – 7 January 1899), next Metropolitan Archbishop of Toronto (Canada) (1899.01.07 – 1908.05.04), emeritus as Titular Archbishop of Laodicea (1908.05.04 – death 1911.06.30)
 Fergus Patrick McEvay (August 6, 1899 - April 13, 1908), next Metropolitan Archbishop of Toronto (Canada) (1908.04.13 – death 1911.05.10)
 Michael Francis Fallon, Missionary Oblates of Mary Immaculate (O.M.I.) (April 25, 1910 - death February 22, 1931)
 Thomas Kidd (July 3, 1931 - death June 2, 1950), previously Bishop of Calgary (Alberta, Canada) (1925.02.06 – 1931.07.03)
 John Christopher Cody (June 2, 1950 – death December 5, 1963), previously Bishop of Victoria (Canada) (1936.12.09 – 1946.04.06), Titular Bishop of Elatea (1946.04.06 – 1950.06.02) as Coadjutor Bishop of London (1946.04.06 – 1950.06.02)
 Gerald Emmett Carter (February 17, 1964 - April 29, 1978), succeeded as previous Titular Bishop of Altiburus (1961.12.01 – 1964.02.17) and Auxiliary Bishop of London (1961.12.01 – 1964.02.17); also President of Canadian Conference of Catholic Bishops (1975 – 1977); later Metropolitan Archbishop of Toronto (Canada) (1978.04.27 – retired 1990.03.17), created Cardinal-Priest of S. Maria in Traspontina (1979.06.30 – death 2003.04.06)
 John Michael Sherlock (July 8, 1978 - April 27, 2002), also President of Canadian Conference of Catholic Bishops (1983 – 1985); succeeded as previous Titular Bishop of Macriana in Mauretania (1974.06.25 – 1978.07.07) and Auxiliary Bishop of London (1974.06.25 – 1978.07.07); Bishop Emeritus when he died
 Auxiliary Bishop: Marcel André J. Gervais (1980.04.19 – 1985.05.03), Titular Bishop of Rosemarkie (1980.04.19 – 1985.05.03); later Bishop of Sault Sainte Marie (Canada) (1985.05.03 – 1989.05.13), Coadjutor Archbishop of Ottawa (Ontario, Canada) (1989.05.13 – 1989.09.27) succeeding as Metropolitan Archbishop of Ottawa (Canada) (1989.09.27 – retired 2007.05.14), President of Canadian Conference of Catholic Bishops (1991 – 1993)
 Auxiliary Bishop: Frederick Bernard Henry (1986.04.18 – 1995.03.24), Titular Bishop of Carinola (1986.04.18 – 1995.03.24); later Bishop of Thunder Bay (Canada) (1995.03.24 – 1998.01.19), Bishop of Calgary  (Canada) (1998.01.19 – retired 2017.01.04)
 Auxiliary Bishop: Richard John Grecco (1997.12.05 – 2002.04.27), Titular Bishop of Uccula (1997.12.05 – 2009.07.11); later Bishop of Charlottetown (Canada) (2009.07.11 – ...)
 Ronald Peter Fabbro, C.S.B. (August 15, 2002 - ...), previously Superior General of Congregation of St. Basil (Basilians) (1997 – 2002.04.27).
 Auxiliary Bishop: Robert Anthony Daniels (2004.09.21 – 2011.03.01), Titular Bishop of Scebatiana (2004.09.21 – 2011.03.01); next Bishop of Grand Falls (Canada) (2011.03.01 – ...)
 Auxiliary Bishop: Józef Andrzej Dąbrowski, Michaelites (C.S.M.A.) (2015.01.31 – ...), Titular Bishop of Casæ in Numidia  (2015.01.31 – ...).

Other priests of this diocese who became bishops
 Eugène Philippe LaRocque, appointed Bishop of Alexandria in Ontario in 1974
 James Leonard Doyle, appointed Bishop of Peterborough, Ontario in 1976
 William Terrence McGrattan, appointed Auxiliary Bishop of Toronto, Ontario in 2009

Education
 Conseil scolaire catholique Providence
 Brant Haldimand Norfolk Catholic District School Board
 Huron Perth Catholic District School Board
 London District Catholic School Board
 St. Clair Catholic District School Board
 Windsor-Essex Catholic District School Board

Churches

Cemeteries
 Heavenly Rest Catholic Cemetery (Windsor)
 Resurrection Catholic Cemetery (Sarnia)
 St. Peter's Catholic Cemetery (London)

See also 
 List of Catholic dioceses in Canada
 Ecclesiastical Province of Toronto
 St. Peter's Cathedral Basilica
 St. Peter's Seminary
 Our Lady of the Assumption

References

Sources and external links 
 Roman Catholic Diocese of London site
 GCatholic, with Google map - date for all sections
 St. Peter's Seminary (Diocese of London, Ontario) 

 Bibliography

Roman Catholic bishops of London, Ontario
Roman Catholic Ecclesiastical Province of Toronto
Organizations based in London
1856 establishments in Ontario
1856 establishments in Canada